Richard (Richie) Goss (1915–1941) was an executed Irish Republican and one of the few Protestant members of the Irish Republican Army (IRA) in the 1940s. Goss was a leader in a major bombing and sabotage campaign in England (1939–40).

Background

Richard Goss was from Dundalk and joined the North Louth Battalion of the IRA at age 18. Goss was arrested several times for his IRA activities and (in 1941) was arrested and shortly thereafter executed by the Irish Free State Army.

S-Plan and Arrest

In early 1938, the then IRA Chief of Staff, Sean Russell, ordered Goss to go to Dublin to assist in the ongoing preparations the upcoming sabotage campaign in England (S-Plan). The S-Plan was a campaign of bombing and sabotage against the civil, economic and military infrastructure of the United Kingdom from 1939 to 1940. During the campaign there were 300 explosions, 10 deaths and 96 injuries. Richie Goss was then sent to England where he helped to organise IRA Units, safe-houses etc for the campaign. During the campaign Goss was the IRA's Operations Officer in Manchester. In May 1939 Goss was arrested in Liverpool (while waiting for a bus back to Manchester) for refusing to account for £20 in his possession and was sentenced to seven-days in Walton Gaol - when released he reported back to the IRA in London.

About two months later, he returned to Ireland but was unlucky enough to be grabbed by the Free State Army in their round-up of known and suspected IRA members and supporters.
The Republican-minded lawyer, Seán MacBride (former Chief of Staff of the IRA) supported the Republican prisoners and on 1 December 1939, (due to McBride's 'habeas corpus' application) Richie Goss and fifty-two other Republican prisoners were released from Mountjoy Jail.

Arrest and Execution

The men reported back to their IRA Unit's and continued the fight - Richie Goss was promoted to the position of Divisional Officer Commanding of the North-Leinster/South Ulster IRA. On 18 July 1941, Richie Goss was staying in the house of a family named Casey in Longford when it was surrounded by Free State troops and Special Branch police — Garda Síochána; a shoot-out ended in the capture of the then twenty-six years old Richie Goss. In the cross fire two soldiers were wounded, resulting in a charge of shooting at members of the Garda and members of the Defense Forces with intent to evade arrest.  Although Goss was not charged with the wounding of the soldiers and no one was killed, in July 1941 an Irish Free State Military Court (under the Emergency Powers Act 1939) returned a guilty verdict on Richie Goss and sentenced the IRA man to death (at that time there was no right to appeal for rulings of a Military Court). He was executed by firing squad in Portlaoise Prison on 9 August 1941 and buried in the prison yard.  Maurice O'Neill and Richard Goss were the only people executed by the state for a non-murder crime.

In September 1948 (seven years after his execution) his remains were released and re-interred in Dowdallshill Cemetery, Dundalk, County Louth.

References 

Executed Irish people
People executed by Ireland by firing squad 
Irish republicans
Irish Republican Army (1922–1969) members
Protestant Irish nationalists
1915 births
1941 deaths